Jubilee Gardens is a public park on the South Bank in the London Borough of Lambeth. Created in 1977 to mark the Silver Jubilee of Elizabeth II, the site was formerly used for the Dome of Discovery and the adjacent Skylon during the Festival of Britain in 1951. A multimillion-pound redevelopment of the park was completed in May 2012, just before the Diamond Jubilee of Elizabeth II and the 2012 Summer Olympics, in order to transform it from a state of grassland to a mature looking park with trees and hills. The re-developed Gardens were designed by Dutch landscape architects West 8.  Queen Elizabeth II reopened the gardens in October 2012.

The park is the site of a memorial to the casualties of the International Brigades of the Spanish Civil War, especially the British Battalion which took very heavy casualties. There is also a paving stone at the foot of the flagpole in memory of John Dimmer (VC) a WWI hero. The park's neighbours are the London Eye, the Shell Centre, County Hall and the River Thames.

Gallery

See also
Parks and open spaces in London

References

External links

 
 Aerial photos of the site in 1921, 1924, 1939, 1946, 1948, 1949 and 1952

Parks and open spaces in the London Borough of Lambeth
Parks and open spaces on the River Thames
History of the London Borough of Lambeth
Silver Jubilee of Elizabeth II